In the thermodynamics of equilibrium, a state function, function of state, or point function for a thermodynamic system is a mathematical function relating several state variables or state quantities (that describe equilibrium states of a system) that depend only on the current equilibrium thermodynamic state of the system (e.g. gas, liquid, solid, crystal, or emulsion), not the path which the system has taken to reach that state. A state function describes equilibrium states of a system, thus also describing the type of system. A state variable is typically a state function so the determination of other state variable values at an equilibrium state also determines the value of the state variable as the state function at that state. The ideal gas law is a good example. In this law, one state variable (e.g., pressure, volume, temperature, or the amount of substance in a gaseous equilibrium system) is a function of other state variables so is regarded as a state function. A state function could also describe the number of a certain type of atoms or molecules in a gaseous, liquid, or solid form in a heterogeneous or homogeneous mixture, or the amount of energy required to create such a system or change the system into a different equilibrium state.

Internal energy, enthalpy, and entropy are examples of state quantities or state functions because they quantitatively describe an equilibrium state of a thermodynamic system, regardless of how the system has arrived in that state. In contrast, mechanical work and heat are process quantities or path functions because their values depend on a specific "transition" (or "path") between two equilibrium states that a system has taken to reach the final equilibrium state. Heat (in certain discrete amounts) can describe a state function such as enthalpy, but in general, does not truly describe the system unless it is defined as the state function of a certain system, and thus enthalpy is described by an amount of heat. This can also apply to entropy when heat is compared to temperature. The description breaks down for quantities exhibiting hysteresis.

History
It is likely that the term "functions of state" was used in a loose sense during the 1850s and 1860s by those such as Rudolf Clausius, William Rankine, Peter Tait, and William Thomson. By the 1870s, the term had acquired a use of its own. In his 1873 paper "Graphical Methods in the Thermodynamics of Fluids", Willard Gibbs states: "The quantities v, p, t, ε, and η are determined when the state of the body is given, and it may be permitted to call them functions of the state of the body."

Overview
A thermodynamic system is described by a number of thermodynamic parameters (e.g. temperature, volume, or pressure) which are not necessarily independent. The number of parameters needed to describe the system is the dimension of the state space of the system. For example, a monatomic gas with a fixed number of particles is a simple case of a two-dimensional system. Any two-dimensional system is uniquely specified by two parameters. Choosing a different pair of parameters, such as pressure and volume instead of pressure and temperature, creates a different coordinate system in two-dimensional thermodynamic state space but is otherwise equivalent. Pressure and temperature can be used to find volume, pressure and volume can be used to find temperature, and temperature and volume can be used to find pressure. An analogous statement holds for higher-dimensional spaces, as described by the state postulate.

Generally, a state space is defined by an equation of the form , where  denotes pressure,  denotes temperature,  denotes volume, and the ellipsis denotes other possible state variables like particle number  and entropy . If the state space is two-dimensional as in the above example, it can be visualized as a three-dimensional graph (a surface in three-dimensional space). However, the labels of the axes are not unique (since there are more than three state variables in this case), and only two independent variables are necessary to define the state.

When a system changes state continuously, it traces out a "path" in the state space. The path can be specified by noting the values of the state parameters as the system traces out the path, whether as a function of time or a function of some other external variable. For example, having the pressure  and volume  as functions of time from time  to  will specify a path in two-dimensional state space. Any function of time can then be integrated over the path. For example, to calculate the work done by the system from time  to time , calculate . In order to calculate the work  in the above integral, the functions  and  must be known at each time  over the entire path. In contrast, a state function only depends upon the system parameters' values at the endpoints of the path.

In the equation,  can be expressed as the exact differential of the function . The product  is therefore a state function of the system.

The notation  will be used for an exact differential. The symbol  will be reserved for an inexact differential, which cannot be integrated without full knowledge of the path. For example,  will be used to denote an infinitesimal increment of work.

State functions represent quantities or properties of a thermodynamic system, while non-state functions represent a process during which the state functions change. For example, the state function  is proportional to the internal energy of an ideal gas, but the work  is the amount of energy transferred as the system performs work. Internal energy is identifiable; it is a particular form of energy. Work is the amount of energy that has changed its form or location.

List of state functions

The following are considered to be state functions in thermodynamics:

 Mass
 Energy
 Enthalpy
 Internal energy
 Gibbs free energy
 Helmholtz free energy
 Exergy
 Entropy
 Pressure
 Temperature
 Volume
 Chemical composition
 Pressure altitude
 Specific volume or its reciprocal density
 Particle number

See also
Markov property
Conservative vector field
Nonholonomic system
Equation of state
State variable

Notes

References

External links

 
Thermodynamic properties
Continuum mechanics